Luis Edmundo Durán Riquelme (born 2 June 1979) is a Chilean former professional footballer who played as a defender.

Career
Born in Valdivia, Chile, he began his career playing for Deportes Linares in the Primera B de Chile in 1998. He stayed in the Chilean football until 2006, when he moved to Indonesia and joined Mitra Kukar in the Divisi Satu. In 2009 he joined Persita Tangerang in the Divisi Utama, staying at the club until 2016.

Following his retirement, he developed a coaching career in Persita Tangerang at youth level.

References

External links
 
 
 
 Luis Durán at MemoriaWanderers 
 http://luisduranr.blogspot.com/

Living people
1979 births
People from Valdivia
Association football defenders
Chilean footballers
Chilean expatriate footballers
Chile youth international footballers
Deportes Linares footballers
Unión La Calera footballers
Deportes Ovalle footballers
Deportes Copiapó footballers
Santiago Wanderers footballers
Mitra Kukar players
Persis Solo players
Persita Tangerang players
Primera B de Chile players
Chilean Primera División players
Liga 2 (Indonesia) players
Liga 1 (Indonesia) players
Chilean expatriate sportspeople in Indonesia
Expatriate footballers in Indonesia
Chilean football managers
Chilean expatriate football managers
Expatriate football managers in Indonesia